Seda Nur İncik (born 6 October 2000) is a Turkish female football midfielder playing in the Turkish Women's First League for Beşiktaş J.K. with jersey number 8. She was a member of the Turkey girl's U-17 and Turkey women's U-19 teams.

Early years 
Seda Nur İncik was born as the second child to a trader family in Kepez, Antalya on 6 October 2000.

At age eight, she began to play football with boys of her neighborhood. She continued to play in the breaktime during her primary education. She then became a member of the newly established girls' football team of her scholl.

Club career 

Seda Nur İncik obtained her license on January 14, 2014, and was admitted to the 1207 Antalyaspor club in her hometown. She made her first appearance in the 2014–15 season. She played five years in her hometown's club.

İncik transferred to the İzmir-based club Konak Belediyespor in the 2019-20 Turkish Women's First Football League season after playing five years for her hometown team.

She transferred to Beşiktaş J.K. in the 2020-21 Turkcell Women's Football League season. She enjoyed her team's champions title, and played in two matches of the 2021–22 UEFA Women's Champions League qualifying rounds.

International career 
İncik was admitted to the Turkey girls' national U-17 team and took part in one match of the 2015 UEFA Women's Under-16 Development Tournament, in one of the 2016 UEFA Women's Under-17 Championship qualification, three of the 2016 UEFA Women's Under-16 Development Tournament and three of the 2017 UEFA Women's Under-17 Championship qualification matches.

She was called up to the Turkey women's U-19 team, and debuted at the 2017 UEFA Women's Under-19 Championship qualification Elite round Gr. 2 against Denmark on April 10, 2017. She participated in three matches of the 2017 UEFA Women's Under-19 Championship qualification Elite round Gr. 4. She played in three matches of the 2019 UEFA Women's Under-19 Championship qualification - Group 2 and then three games of the Elite round. She scored one goal against Cyprus.

In 2021, İncik was admitted to the Turkey team.

 1 Friendly matches not included

Career statistics 
.

Honours 
 Turkish Women's Second League
 1207 Antalyaspor
 Winners (1): 2014–15

 Turkish Women's SFirst League
 Beşiktaş J.K.
 Winners (1):  2020–21

References 

2000 births
Living people
Sportspeople from Antalya
Turkish women's footballers
Women's association football midfielders
1207 Antalya Spor players
Konak Belediyespor players
Beşiktaş J.K. women's football players
Turkish Women's Football Super League players